Ramunė Adomaitienė (born 5 November 1968) is an athlete set to compete for Lithuania at the 2020 Summer Paralympics. In her youth she considered competing in heptathlon at the Olympics but did not make the, then, Soviet team and in time became a physical education teacher. She became disabled due to a vehicular accident that killed her husband. She competed in the 2012 and 2016 Paralympics.

References 

1968 births
Living people
Sportspeople from Klaipėda
Soviet heptathletes
Lithuanian heptathletes
Lithuanian female discus throwers
Lithuanian female javelin throwers
Lithuanian female long jumpers
Lithuanian female shot putters
Paralympic athletes of Lithuania
Athletes (track and field) at the 2012 Summer Paralympics
Athletes (track and field) at the 2016 Summer Paralympics
World Para Athletics Championships winners
Medalists at the World Para Athletics Championships
Medalists at the World Para Athletics European Championships